Yo Canto (Spanish for I Sing) is a Puerto Rican singing talent contest that started airing in 2011 on WKAQ-TV, the Telemundo outlet in Puerto Rico. It is produced by Soraya Sánchez, who previously produced the similar show Objetivo Fama, and Beatriz Oliveros. In contrast to Objetivo Fama, Yo Canto features singers from all ages, and contestants can participate as a group or duo.

The show features a group of aspiring singers who compete on a weekly talent show. During each show, contestants are evaluated by a panel judges, and are gradually eliminated until only one prevails. During the time of the show, contestants are "bunkered" in a studio/house where they will live together for several months. The show's first season began airing on February 5, 2011.

The show is hosted by Daniela Droz and Ektor. The winner of the competition was the Cuban duo FM5.

Auditions

Before the show season starts, auditions are held at several places in Puerto Rico and the United States to pick the finalists that will be featured in the show. These are evaluated by the show's producers. When the final contestants are selected, they are moved to Puerto Rico where the studio/house is located. Auditions were held in New York City, Miami, Florida, and Puerto Rico (Ponce, San Juan, and Mayagüez). On January 29, 2011, a show called Yo Canto: Las Audiciones aired on Telemundo as a preamble to the show.

Contestants

After the auditions, a group of 18 contestants were selected:

Weekly  Shows

During the weekly shows, each contestant performs the song they had received and rehearsed during the week. After each presentation, each contestant is evaluated by the panel of judges, who assign a score from 1 to 10. At the end of the show, the host announce which contestants have the lowest points. Viewers then have one week to call and "save" their favorite contestant.

Two additional shows (Yo Canto Extra and Yo Canto Backstage) follows the contestants during their week of rehearsal, and their reactions after each show.

Judges
 Roberto Sueiro, a Puerto Rican artist and entertainment attorney, who also had a brief singing career. He served as judge of Objetivo Fama during all its seasons (2004–2009).
 Deddie Romero, a Puerto Rican actress, singer, and radio host.
Manny Manuel, a Puerto Rican singer of merengue with more than 20 years of experience.

Seasons Synopsis

Episodes

First night: February 12, 2011

Reggaeton duo RKM & Ken-Y were the guest artists of the night. Initially, there was an error in the vote tally that had Franie and Andrea as the Bottom 2 contestants. After the show, the producers made the correction which ended with Favela and Andrea in the bottom instead.

Second night: February 19, 2011

Due to a tie between Franie and Charlie, the judges had to decide which one to save. They chose Franie. Also, due to last week's error in the tally, the audience was asked to vote if they wanted to skip the elimination process for this night. 85.5% voted not to eliminate anyone.

Third night: February 26, 2011

53% of the audience voted to save Charli, instead of Moisés. Also, the reggaeton duo, Dyland & Lenny, were the special guests of the night.

Fourth night: March 5, 2011

52% of the audience voted to save Tivián, instead of Franie. Also, reggaeton singers Gotcho and Jowell, and singer Jencarlos Canela were the guest artists of the night.

Fifth night: March 12, 2011

The show was dedicated to Latin American divas like Olga Tañón, Ednita Nazario, Yolandita Monge, Thalía and Gloria Estefan. The show opened with a group of transgender artists imitating the divas.

Guest artists were reggaeton singers JKing & Maximan. Musa and Tivián were the contestants "threatened" last week. 65% of the audience voted to save Musa.

Sixth night: March 19, 2011

Judge Manny Manuel was absent from this show due to previous obligations. Guest singer Gloria Trevi replaced him as guest judge.

Favela and Andrea were the contestants "threatened" last week. 91% of the audience voted to save Favela.

Seventh night: March 26, 2011

During the opening, the contestants sang Ricky Martin's "Livin' la Vida Loca".

Juan Vélez, winner of the fourth season of Objetivo Fama, and brother of Abimelec, was the guest singer. Charli, Musa, and Yaza were the contestants "threatened" last week. 58% of the audience voted to save Yaza, while Charli and Musa received 19% and 23% of the votes.

Eight night: April 2, 2011

The guest artists of the night were pop-rock singer Sie7e and reggaeton duo Alexis & Fido. The contestants that were "threatened" last week were Joaquín and Mari Z. 61% of the audience voted to save Mari Z.

Ninth night: April 9, 2011

The night was dedicated to music from popular films. The contestants opened with a dancing number from Grease.

The guest artist of the night was Carlos Baute, who sang a song with Massiel. The contestants with fewest votes were Argel and Mari Z. The judges decided to save Argel.

Tenth night: April 16, 2011

The contestants also had a chance to sing in groups. Males, females, and duets were paired with each other to sing an additional song. Abimelec, who was suspended for the week, couldn't sing with males Jonathan and Argel.

Antonio Orozco and the a cappella group Nota were the guest artists. The contestants with fewest votes were Cubans Argel and Massiel. The judges decided to save Massiel.

Eleventh night: April 23, 2011

Due to the celebration of Holy Week, all the performances of the show were of spiritual or religious songs. The contestants opened the show singing "Creeré" of Christian duo Tercer Cielo.

Also, some contestants had a chance to sing an additional song with a special guest.

In the end, the contestants with fewest votes were Diomary and Yeika. After much deliberation, the judges decided to save Diomary.

Twelfth night: April 30, 2011

The show was dedicated to 80s music. All the contestants sang in the opening which featured songs like "Súbete a Mi Moto", "Mi Banda Toca Rock", and "A Volar", from 80s boyband Menudo.

The contestants had an opportunity to sing a song with other contestants, although no points were given.

Singer Divino was the guest artist of the night. The two contestants with fewest votes were NXO and Massiel. The judges unanimously decided to save NXO.

Thirteenth night: May 7, 2011

Final night: May 14, 2011

Also, during the presentation each finalist had a special presentation with a guest singer.

Finally, the two finalists had a chance to sing their own compositions. Jonathan sang "Misterio" and FM5 sang "Ni Una Lágrima". At the end of the show, FM5 was announced as the winner of the competition with 55% of the votes.

Elimination chart

1 Due to a production error in the vote tally the previous week, the audience was asked to vote if they wanted to skip the elimination process, resulting in no eliminations during the second week.

Reception

During the final weeks of the competition, producer Soraya Sánchez was asked about the show's ratings to which she replied that "they've been good in general" and that they were "in a good path". Sánchez has said that she is looking forward to future seasons of the singing competition show and that this first experience was "a promising start". She also said that the participation in the voting was at "half a million votes".

See also
Similar shows
Objetivo Fama
Operación Triunfo
American Idol
Pop Idol
Star Search
La Academia
Voces en Función

References

External links
Official Page

Singing talent shows
2011 Puerto Rican television series debuts
2010s Puerto Rican television series
2010s American reality television series